Buhl Public Library is the public library serving Buhl, Minnesota, United States.  Its building was constructed from 1917 to 1918 with local tax revenue from a mining boom.  It was listed on the National Register of Historic Places in 1983 for its local significance in the themes of architecture and education.  It was nominated for symbolizing how a company town used local funds to serve the educational and cultural needs of its multi-ethnic populace.

See also
 National Register of Historic Places listings in St. Louis County, Minnesota

References

External links
 Buhl Public Library

1918 establishments in Minnesota
Buildings and structures in St. Louis County, Minnesota
Education in St. Louis County, Minnesota
Libraries on the National Register of Historic Places in Minnesota
Library buildings completed in 1918
National Register of Historic Places in St. Louis County, Minnesota
Public libraries in Minnesota